Kalamazoo Public Schools is a school district headquartered in Kalamazoo, Michigan. Graduates of the district are eligible to receive scholarships through the Kalamazoo Promise, a program launched in 2005 and funded by anonymous donors. The district operates 31 schools.

The district includes the majority of Kalamazoo, all of Westwood, and most of Eastwood. It also includes sections of the following townships: Comstock, Kalamazoo, Oshtemo, and Texas.

Scholarship program
Every resident graduate of the Kalamazoo Public Schools is provided with a scholarship for up to 100% of tuition and mandatory fee costs for four years at any public university or community college in Michigan, starting with the class of 2006. This program is known as the Kalamazoo Promise. Books and room and board are not included. In 2014, it was announced that 15 private colleges would also be included as Promise-eligible schools. In 2015, Communities in Schools of Kalamazoo received Communities in Schools' national Unsung Heroes award in recognition of elementary school programs aimed at overcoming cultural and language barriers faced by students.

Schools
Publicly funded schools in the Kalamazoo Public Schools district include:

Elementary schools

 Arcadia Elementary
 Edison Environmental Science Academy
 El Sol Elementary
 Greenwood Elementary
 Indian Prairie Elementary
 King-Westwood Elementary
 Lincoln International Studies School
 Milwood Elementary
 Northeastern Elementary
 Northglade Montessori Magnet School
 Prairie Ridge Elementary
 Parkwood-Upjohn Elementary
 Spring Valley Center for Exploration
 Washington Writers' Academy
 Winchell Elementary
 Woods Lake Elementary: A Magnet Center for the Arts
 Woodward School For Technology and Research

Middle schools

 Alternative Learning Program (ALP)
 Hillside Middle School
 Maple Street Magnet School for the Arts
 Milwood Magnet School: A Center for Math, Science and Technology
 Linden Grove Middle School

High schools

 Loy Norrix High School
 Kalamazoo Innovative Learning Program (KILP)
 Kalamazoo Central High School
 Phoenix High School

See also
 List of school districts in Michigan

References

External links
 

School districts in Michigan
Education in Kalamazoo, Michigan